Liu Yunchang (born 20 February 1912 in Anguo, Hebei, China; died 17 January 1993 in Beijing, China) was a Chinese basketball player who competed in the 1936 Summer Olympics. He was part of the Chinese basketball team, which was eliminated in the second round of the Olympic tournament. He played one match. After his basketball career, he became a politician.

References

External links

1912 births
1993 deaths
Chinese men's basketball players
Olympic basketball players of China
Basketball players at the 1936 Summer Olympics
Republic of China men's national basketball team players